Agostino Bassi, sometimes called de Lodi (25 September 1773 – 8 February 1856), was an Italian entomologist. He preceded Louis Pasteur in the discovery that microorganisms can be the cause of disease (the germ theory of disease). He discovered that the muscardine disease of silkworms was caused by a living, very small, parasitic organism, a fungus that would be named eventually Beauveria bassiana in his honor. In 1844, he stated the idea that not only animal (insect), but also human diseases are caused by other living microorganisms; for example, measles, syphilis, and the plague.

Early life
He was the son of a wealthy farmer and a lawyer who also had a passion for biology. However, his father did not want him to take up biology, but wanted him instead to look after the family's property, to become a civil servant and to join the Imperial administration.

Bassi did so, but also followed the lessons of  Lazzaro Spallanzani, a relative, until he died.

Career
His studies of 1807 concerned mal de segno (also known as muscardine, after a French candy), a lethal disease of domestic silkworms (Bombyx mori). Infected caterpillars are covered with a fine white powder and die. This disease initially appeared in Italy around 1805; then in France, by 1841. After 1849, the silk farms were almost all abandoned because of this devastating disease. Giacomo Maria Foscarini had proved that muscardine was contagious. The research to find the cause of the disease took Bassi 25 years. He published the results of his investigations in a paper entitled Del mal del segno, calcinaccio o moscardino (1835), stating that a living entity was the culprit, and that it was contagious; we now know that the powdery appearance on the killed silkworms is caused by the production of millions of infectious white fungal spores on the dead insect (see Beauveria bassiana). He is credited with rescuing the economically important silk industry, by recommendations like the use of disinfectants; separating the rows of feeding caterpillars; isolating and destroying infected caterpillars; and keeping the farms clean. This brought Bassi immediate fame. "Del Mal del Segno, Calcinaccio o Moscardino" was translated into French and distributed throughout Europe.

From this work he expanded on a theory explaining that many diseases of plants, animals and human beings were caused by pathogenic organisms. He thus preceded the work of Louis Pasteur and Robert Koch. He was also the author of work on the culture of potatoes, on cheese, wine making, leprosy and cholera.
Louis Pasteur (1822–1895) was greatly influenced by his work. Pasteur had the portraits of both Spallanzani and Bassi in his office.

Bassi’s tomb in Lodi

Agostino Bassi was buried in the Romanesque church of Saint Francis (13th century). His tomb can be seen in the right transept, laid to a wall, at the ground level.

Philately
In 1953 the Italian post office issued a stamp on the 180th anniversary of Bassi's birth in 1773. The stamp features a portrait of Bassi bordered by silkmoth adults and pupae .

References

 
(reviewed in  )

External links

 Some places and memories related to Agostino Bassi

Italian entomologists
Italian Roman Catholics
1773 births
1856 deaths